Live at Yankee Stadium is a 1969 live album by The Isley Brothers, released on their own T-Neck label. While the Isleys appear in this live album, it is actually a live showcase by the group to conjoin artists that signed to their T-Neck label and Buddah Records-associated acts including Judy White, the girl group Sweet Cherries, the gospel group the Edwin Hawkins Singers and the family soul group the Five Stairsteps. All the guest artists except for the Edwin Hawkins Singers sang songs that were written and produced for them by the Isleys. The Isleys performed their then-current hits "It's Your Thing", "I Turned You On" and the 1959 classic, "Shout", bringing in audience members alongside them as they ended the performance.

The album peaked at No. 34 on the Billboard Soul LPs chart in December 1969. It was remastered and expanded for inclusion in the 2015 released CD box set The RCA Victor & T-Neck Album Masters, 1959-1983. The expanded CD only features additional performances by The Brooklyn Bridge, there are no additional Isley Brothers tracks.

Live at Yankee Stadium was independently filmed and was funded by the Isley Brothers. It was released in theaters as It's Your Thing in August 1970.

Track listing

Notes
The version of "It's Your Thing" heard here appears on the Isley Brothers' career-spanning 1999 boxed set It's Your Thing: The Story of the Isley Brothers, the liner notes to which say the concert took place on June 21, 1969.

References

External links 

 

The Isley Brothers albums
1969 live albums
T-Neck Records live albums
Albums produced by Rudolph Isley
Albums produced by Ronald Isley
Concert films